The Laffit Pincay Jr. Award is an honor given annually since 2004 by Hollywood Park Racetrack in Inglewood, California to someone who has served the horse racing industry with integrity, dedication, determination and distinction. Named for retired U.S. Racing Hall of Fame jockey Laffit Pincay, Jr., the award, designed by American sculptor Nina Kaiser, is presented on Hollywood Gold Cup Day, a racecard that features the premier race Pincay won a record nine times.

When Hollywood Park closed the award was moved to Del Mar Racetrack in 2014.

Winners of the Laffit Pincay Jr. Award
 2022 : Ron McAnally
 2021 : Gregory Ferraro
 2020 : none
 2019 : Julie Krone
 2018 : Martine Bellocq
 2017 : Mike E. Smith Hall of Fame Jockey
 2016 : Chris McCarron Hall of Fame Jockey
 2015 : Victor Espinoza Hall of Fame Jockey
 2014 : Art Sherman Thoroughbred Horse Trainer
 2013 : Eddie Delahoussaye Hall of Fame Jockey
 2012 : John Harris
 2011 : Jerry & Ann Moss, longtime owners, own Zenyatta
 2010 : Oak Tree Racing Association 
 2009 : Merlin Volzke, jockey 
 2008 : Pete Pedersen, longtime California race steward 
 2007 : Ellwood W. "Bud" Johnston — Director and president of the California Thoroughbred Breeders Association for 25 years. He is the owner of Old English Rancho, breeders of more than 200 stakes winners and the leading North American breeder in 1971 and 1972
 2006 : Mel and Warren Stute — Brothers who are longtime Thoroughbred horse trainers
 2005 : Noble Threewitt — Thoroughbred trainer and humanitarian who trained for 75 years and who at age 95 became the oldest trainer to win a race in North America.
 2004 : Bob Benoit — Employee and executive with Hollywood Park Racetrack for more than fifty years

References

Horse racing in the United States
Horse racing awards
Awards established in 2004